2020 Championship League may refer to:

2020 Championship League (2019–20 season), a non-ranking snooker tournament held in June 2020
2020 Championship League (ranking), a ranking snooker tournament held in September and October 2020